The Suggan Buggan River is a perennial river of the Snowy River catchment, located in the Alpine region of the Australian state of Victoria.

Course and features
Formed by the confluence of the Berrima River and the Freestone Creek, the Suggan Buggan River rises in a remote alpine wilderness area within the Alpine National Park, south of the Black-Allan Line that forms part of the state border between New South Wales and Victoria. The river flows generally southeast by south through the locality of Suggan Buggan, joined by the Ingeegoodbee River and two minor tributaries, before reaching its confluence with the Snowy River in the Shire of East Gippsland, north of the Snowy River National Park. The river descends  over its  course.

The river is traversed by the Snowy River Road (C608).

Recreational activity

Many parts of the river are inaccessible during winter months.

Etymology
The river's name is derived from the Aboriginal phrase bukkan bukkan, referring to "bags made from grass".

History

Aboriginal history
The traditional custodians of the land surrounding the Suggan Buggan river are the Australian Aboriginal Bidawal and Nindi-Ngudjam Ngarigu Monero peoples.

European history
The first run in the district was taken up by William Woodhouse in 1843 who passed it on to Scottish-born Australian pioneer and entrepreneur Benjamin Boyd in 1845. The property was transferred to Edward O'Rourke in 1858 who had travelled south from the Monaro plains with his young family. He stayed for 25 years before moving south to Wulgulmerang, which began its life as another O'Rourke station, and then west to the Omeo station at Benambra. O'Rourke used local Murray pines to build the first permanent home in the area. The O'Rourke's ownership ended in 1902 when the property was sold to John Churchill Rogers.

See also

 List of rivers of Australia

References

External links
 
 
 
 

East Gippsland catchment
Rivers of Gippsland (region)
Snowy River